Frank Nazar III (born January 14, 2004) is an American collegiate ice hockey center for the University of Michigan of the National Collegiate Athletic Association (NCAA). He was drafted 13th overall by the Chicago Blackhawks in the 2022 NHL Entry Draft.

Playing career
Nazar spent two seasons with the USA Hockey National Team Development Program. During the 2021–22 season, he recorded 28 goals and 42 assists in 56 games and ranked third on the team with 70 points. Nazar competed at the 2022 BioSteel All-American Game.

Nazar is committed to play college ice hockey for the Michigan Wolverines during the 2022–23 season. In October 2022 it was announced that a lower body injury Nazar sustained in the offseason required surgery, and he would miss the majority of the season. He made his debut for the Wolverines on February 10, 2023, in a game against Michigan State.

He was drafted 13th overall by the Chicago Blackhawks in the 2022 NHL Entry Draft.

International play

Nazar represented the United States at the 2020 Winter Youth Olympics, where he recorded three goals and two assists in four games and won a silver medal.

Nazar represented the United States at the 2022 IIHF World U18 Championships, where he recorded three goals and six assists in six games and won a silver medal.

Career statistics

Regular season and playoffs

International

References

External links
 

2004 births
Living people
Chicago Blackhawks draft picks
Ice hockey people from Michigan
Ice hockey players at the 2020 Winter Youth Olympics
Michigan Wolverines men's ice hockey players
National Hockey League first-round draft picks
People from Mount Clemens, Michigan
USA Hockey National Team Development Program players
Youth Olympic silver medalists for the United States